Moskito may refer to:

 Mosquito Island
 Comte AC-12 Moskito, Swiss light touring airplane
 Focke-Wulf Ta 154 Moskito, German night fighter

See also
Mosquito (disambiguation)
Miskito (disambiguation)